NGC 3873 is an elliptical galaxy located about 300 million light-years away in the constellation Leo. The galaxy was discovered by astronomer Heinrich d'Arrest on May 8, 1864. NGC 3873 is a member of the Leo Cluster.
 
On May 15, 2007 a type Ia supernova designated as SN 2007ci was discovered in NGC 3873.

See also
 NGC 3842

References

External links
 

3873
36670
Leo (constellation)
Leo Cluster
Astronomical objects discovered in 1864
Elliptical galaxies
6735